The Central Dairy Building, also known as Downtown Appliance and Gunther's Games, is a historic commercial building located in downtown Columbia, Missouri.  It was built in 1927, and enlarged to its present size in 1940.  It is a two-story brick building with terra cotta ornamentation elaborate classical and baroque design motifs.  Also on the property is a contributing brick warehouse, constructed about 1940.  Today the building houses an appliance store and restaurants on the first floor and lofts on the second.

It was listed on the National Register of Historic Places in 2005.

References

Commercial buildings on the National Register of Historic Places in Missouri
Commercial buildings completed in 1927
Buildings and structures in Columbia, Missouri
National Register of Historic Places in Boone County, Missouri